Benfeld station (French: Gare de Benfeld) is a French railway station in Benfeld, Bas-Rhin, France.

Railway location 
The station is situated at the kilometric point (KP) 26.687 of the Strasbourg-Basel railway and 160 m above sea level.

Passengers

Facilities 
There is no ticket office at the station, but there is a transport ticket machine.

Services 
The station is served by the TER Grand Est (between Strasbourg and Colmar).

Eurocity Jean Monnet running between Mulhouse-Ville and Luxembourg also services the station once a day.

See also 

 List of SNCF stations in Grand Est

References 

Railway stations in Bas-Rhin
Railway stations in France opened in 1840